Mujahideen Shura Council may refer to:

Mujahideen Shura Council (Iraq)
Mujahideen Shura Council in the Environs of Jerusalem (Egypt, Gaza)
Mujahideen Shura Council (Syria)
Mujahideen Shura (North Waziristan), Pakistan